, also known as Lisa Kudō is a Japanese actress and gravure idol. She was born on October 4, 1983, in Kanagawa, Japan.

Life and career
Kudō began her entertainment career as a "gravure" (non-nude) model in several DVD releases in 2005 and 2006. She made her film debut starring in the small town drama Sleeping Flower in October 2005. The next year, she played the character Chiharu Tanaka in the live action film version of the manga Love Com, which was released to theaters in July 2006. She also had a leading role in the November 2006 film  which also starred Yuma Ishigaki and Yuika Motokariya.

Kudō also appeared in television dramas in 2006, first in the TV movie  broadcast on Nippon Television (NTV) on March 18, 2006 and in the Tokyo Broadcasting System (TBS) series  which ran from July to September 2006.

She was featured as a model in the game , released June 29, 2006, where the player can take photos of the digital model. A limited edition of the game was released that was bundled with the bikini she wears in-game, a DVD and pictures of her.

In 2007 Kudō appeared in an episode of the NTV comedy  as well as continuing her career as a gravure model. Kudō starred in the title role for the low-budget horror film Rika: The Zombie Killer directed by Ken'ichi Fujiwara which was released theatrically in Japan in February 2008 and as a DVD with English subtitles as Zombie Hunter Rika in September 2009.

In August 2008, Kudō performed in the NTV war drama  based on an event which occurred late in World War II and in May 2009, she appeared in the two part TBS TV movie  playing Rino Kinoshita.

Filmography

Movies
  (2005)
  (2006)
  (2006)
  (2008)

Television
  (2006)
  (2007) Episode 6
  (2008)
  (2009)

References

External links

JAPAN MUSIC ENTERTAINMENT profile
Risa Kudo's diary

Japanese gravure models
Japanese actresses
Japanese bloggers
Japanese television personalities
People from Kanagawa Prefecture
1983 births
Living people
Japanese women bloggers